Gastrointestinal campylobacteriosis is caused by Campylobacter jejuni or Campylobacter coli. Although it is a commensal in the gastrointestinal tract of many species, it can cause diarrhea - mainly in young animals. It is most commonly seen in cattle, but may also infect many other species, including humans. Campylobacter is spread horizontally via the fecal-oral route.

Campylobacter fetus can also cause venereal disease and abortion in cattle.


Clinical signs and diagnosis
Calves normally suffer from a blood-flecked, thick, mucoid diarrhea. They may be pyrexic, tachycardic, or tachypneic and suffer weight loss. Adult cattle may show reproductive signs such as anoestrus, irregular oestrus patterns, agalactia, abortion, and infertility.

Campylobacter infection can be confirmed by rising antibody titers, culture on a selective medium, or histological examination. Specifically,  C. fetus can be detected from cervicovaginal mucus using an agglutination test or ELISA.

Treatment and control
C. jejuni can be treated with the antibiotics erythromycin and tetracycline. The disease can be prevented with good husbandry and hygiene measures.

References

Bacterial diseases
Campylobacteriosis